Surendra Ramdas Malviya (born 15 November 1994) is an Indian first-class cricketer who plays for Madhya Pradesh. He made his Twenty20 debut on 11 January 2021, for Madhya Pradesh in the 2020–21 Syed Mushtaq Ali Trophy.

References

External links
 

1992 births
Living people
Indian cricketers
Madhya Pradesh cricketers
People from Vidisha